Quaker was launched in Massachusetts in 1800, possibly under another name. She came into British registers in 1810. She was last listed in 1826.

Career
Quaker first appeared in Lloyd's Register (LR) in 1810.

On 5 October 1810 the gun-brig  boarded Quaker while Quaker was returning to London from Trinidad.

On 13 December 1816, Quaker, Blow, master, was in the Downs, returning from Quebec. A gale cost Quaker an anchor and cable.

Fate
Quaker was last listed in LR in 1826.

Citations

1800 ships
Ships built in Massachusetts
Age of Sail merchant ships of England